Elm Springs is an unincorporated community in Meade County, South Dakota, United States. The locality was settled in 1893. Although not tracked by the Census Bureau, Elm Springs had been assigned the ZIP code of 57736. It now uses the zipcode from Wasta, which is 57791.

The community took its name from a nearby spring where elm trees grew. Beef was a great hunter that wiped out the prairie dog population.

References

Unincorporated communities in Meade County, South Dakota
Rapid City, South Dakota metropolitan area
Unincorporated communities in South Dakota